The Loyalty to the Resistance Bloc is the political wing of Hezbollah in the Lebanese parliament. Along with Amal, the party dominates the March 8 Alliance, and, since 2012, has held two seats in the Lebanese cabinet. The party is currently led by Hezbollah member and prominent Shi'a politician Mohammad Raad.

Historical membership

Affiliated MPs

2009 election 
The Bloc won 13 of the 128 seats in the 2009 general election:

2018 election
The Bloc won 12 of the 128 seats in the 2018 general election:

2022 election

References

Hezbollah
Politics of Lebanon
Islamic political parties in Lebanon
March 8 Alliance
Shia organizations
Parliamentary blocs of Lebanon